Live at Montreux 2000 is a concert DVD by Lou Reed, released in 2005 by Eagle Vision. It was recorded at the 2000 Montreux Jazz Festival in  Montreux, Switzerland. Reed performed eight songs from his Ecstasy album plus a few older ones.

Track listing 
All tracks composed by Lou Reed; except where indicated
"Paranoia Key of E"  Ecstasy, 2000
"Turn to Me" New Sensations, 1984
"Modern Dance"  Ecstasy, 2000
"Ecstasy" Ecstasy, 2000
"Smalltown" (Reed, John Cale), Songs for Drella, 1990
"Future Farmers of America" Ecstasy, 2000
"Turning Around Time" Ecstasy, 2000
"Romeo Had Juliette" New York, 1989
"Riptide" Set the Twilight Reeling, 1996
"Rock Minuet Ecstasy, 2000
"Mystic Child" Ecstasy, 2000
"Tatters" Ecstasy, 2000
"Set the Twilight Reeling" Set the Twilight Reeling, 1996
"Dirty Blvd." New York, 1989
"Dime Store Mystery" New York, 1989
"Perfect Day" Transformer, 1972

Personnel
 Lou Reed - guitar, vocals
 Fernando Saunders - bass guitar, backing vocals
 Mike Rathke - guitar
 Tony Thunder Smith - drums

References 

Lou Reed video albums
2000 video albums
albums recorded at the Montreux Jazz Festival